Events from the year 1790 in Sweden

Incumbents
 Monarch – Gustav III

Events
 April - Ten death sentences is given for participants in the Anjala conspiracy.
 13 May - Battle of Reval
 15 May - Battle of Fredrikshamn
 19 May - Battle of Keltis barracks
 4 July - Battle of Vyborg Bay (1790)
 9 July - Battle of Svensksund
 14 August - Peace between Sweden and Russia in the Treaty of Värälä. 
 8 September - Execution of Johan Henrik Hästesko, the only death sentence of the Anjala conspiracy which is actually performed.
 Anna Maria Engsten awarded with a medal in silver for Valour in Battle at Sea for her act during the Russo-Swedish war.
 Brita Hagberg is awarded with the medal För tapperhet i fält for her military service.
 The noblewomen's social boycott of the monarch is smashed by the arrest of Jeanna von Lantingshausen.
 By royal command, the silk factories are explicitly allowed to employ women workers when no men are available (though women did in practice work in the silk industry earlier), which quickly results in a majority of female workers in the Swedish silk industry. 
 The Turku Philharmonic Orchestra is founded.
 The Haga Echo Temple is completed. 
 Fredmans epistlar by Carl Michael Bellman
 Den nya skapelsen by Johan Henric Kellgren
  by Carl Gustaf af Leopold

Births
 19 January – Per Daniel Amadeus Atterbom, writer  (died 1855)
 26 May - Sara Wacklin, writer and educator (died 1846)
 24 June - Helena Ekblom, religious visionary  (died 1859)
 23 July - Anna Sofia Sevelin, opera singer (died 1871)
 2 September – Magnus Brahe (1790–1844), politician and military (died 1844)
 17 September – Israel Hwasser, physician and writer (died 1860)

Deaths
 16 January - Charlotte Eckerman, opera singer and royal mistress  (born 1759)
 25 June - Lovisa Augusti, opera singer (born 1756)
 Unknown date - Karin Olofsdotter, religious visionary (born 1720)

References

External links

 
Years of the 18th century in Sweden